Phrealcia is a genus of moths of the family Ypsolophidae.

Species
 Phrealcia brevipalpella Chrétien, 1900
 Phrealcia eximiella (Rebel, 1899)
 Phrealcia friesei Mey, 2012
 Phrealcia steueri Mey, 2012
 Phrealcia ussuriensis Rebel, 1901

References

 , 2012: Phrealcia steueri n. sp. und P. friesei n. sp. - zwei neue Arten einer disjunkt verbreiteten Gattung (Lepidoptera, Ypsolophidae). Entomologische Nachrichten und Berichte 56:53- 57.

Ypsolophidae
Moth genera